Akdoğan is a village in the district of Kastamonu, Kastamonu Province, Turkey. Its population is 405 (2021).

References

Villages in Kastamonu District